Roberto Ramírez del Villar Beaumont (6 May 1920 – 29 May 1995) was a Peruvian lawyer and politician. A prominent member of the Christian People's Party, he became a member of the Chamber of Deputies 4 times. He is also known for being the last President of the Chamber of Deputies (1991-1992), the lower house of the Congress of Peru, until the self-coup made by the President Alberto Fujimori.

References

1920 births
1995 deaths
Presidents of the Chamber of Deputies of Peru
20th-century Peruvian lawyers
Christian People's Party (Peru) politicians
Peruvian politicians
People from Arequipa